The 2009 SEC men's basketball tournament took place on March 12–15, 2009 in Tampa, Florida at the St. Pete Times Forum (now known as the Amalie Arena). The first, quarterfinal, and semifinal rounds were televised by Raycom/LF Sports, and the SEC Championship Game was seen on CBS.

SEC Regular Season Standings and Awards

Standings

Awards

All-Conference Team
All-SEC First Team

Bracket

References

SEC men's basketball tournament
-2009 SEC Menand#39;s Basketball Tournament
2009 in sports in Florida
21st century in Tampa, Florida
Basketball competitions in Florida
College sports tournaments in Florida